= Ladder 4 Wine Bar =

Restaurant in Detroit, Michigan, U.S.

- Interactive map of Ladder 4 Wine Bar

Restaurant information
- Location: 3396 Vinewood Street, Detroit, Michigan, 48208, United States
- Coordinates: 42°20′1″N 83°5′53″W

Ladder 4 Wine Bar is a restaurant in Detroit, Michigan. Established in February 2022, the business was included in The New York Times's 2023 list of the 50 best restaurants in the United States.
